USS Union has been the name of more than one ship in the United States Navy, and may refer to:

, an experimental steamer in commission from 1843 to 1847
, a schooner captured from Mexico in November 1846 and wrecked in December 1846
, an armed screw steamer in commission in 1861 and from 1863 to 1865
, an attack cargo ship in commission from 1945 to 1970

United States Navy ship names